Tert may refer to: 

 tert-, a chemical descriptor prefix used to designate tertiary atoms in molecules
 Telomerase reverse transcriptase
 Tert.am, an Armenian news website